Tadeusz Fajfer (born 24 April 1959) is a former Polish footballer who played as a goalkeeper.

Biography
Born in Poznań Fajfer first started his footballing career with Lech Poznań, advancing through the academy before being part of the team in 1980. After two seasons of failing to make an appearance due to being third choice behind Piotr Mowlik and Zbigniew Pleśnierowicz he moved to Lechia Gdańsk in 1982, making his professional league debut against Olimpia Elbląg on 1 September 1982. During his time with Lechia he won the III liga for the 1982–83 season, he played in 5 of the 7 games during the cup run which won the Polish Cup in 1983, beating Piast Gliwice in the final, he played in the Polish SuperCup win over Lech Poznań in 1983, played in both games against Juventus, which were Lechia's first ever European games in the 1983–84 European Cup Winners' Cup, and won promotion to the top division by winning the II liga for the 1983–84 season. During his time at Lechia he played in 51 games. In total Fajfer played 8 games in the I liga before moving down the leagues to play with Chrobry Głogów in 1985. He played for Czarni Wróblewo from 1991–1992, he had a season in Germany with VfL Herzlake with whom he won the Oberliga Nord, before returning to Poland to play with Dyskobolia Grodzisk Wielkopolski. He spent 5 seasons with Dyskobolia, helping the team to go from the fourth division in 1993 to win promotion to the top division in 1997. In his final season with the club, he played 28 out of 30 games in the 1997–98 I liga season before retiring after the club suffered relegation. After retiring he worked as the goalkeeping coach with Dyskobolia before holding roles as sports director at Warta Poznań and Polonia Warsaw.

Honours
Lechia Gdańsk

Polish Cup
Winners: 1983

Polish SuperCup
Winners: 1983

II liga (western group)
Winners: 1983–84

III liga (group II)
Winners: 1982–83

VfL Herzlake

Oberliga Nord
Winners: 1992–93

Dyskobolia Grodzisk Wielkopolski

II liga (western group)
Winners: 1996–97

III liga (group VIII)
Winners: 1995–95

References

1959 births
Living people
Lech Poznań players
Lechia Gdańsk players
Chrobry Głogów players
Dyskobolia Grodzisk Wielkopolski players
Polish footballers
Polish expatriate footballers
Expatriate footballers in Germany
Association football goalkeepers
Polish expatriate sportspeople in Germany